The Margaret River Pro 2015 was an event of the Association of Surfing Professionals for 2015 ASP World Tour.

This event was held from 15 to 26 April at Margaret River, (Western Australia, Australia) and opposed by 18 surfers.

The tournament was won by C.Conlogue (USA), who beat Carissa Moore (HAW) in final.

Round 1

Round 2

Round 3

Round 4

Quarter finals

Semi finals

Final

References

2015 World Surf League
Margaret River Pro
2015 in Australian sport
2015 in Australian women's sport
Sports competitions in Western Australia
Margaret River, Western Australia
Women's surfing
April 2015 sports events in Australia